Non-metastatic cells 4, protein expressed in, also known as NME4, is a protein which in humans is encoded by the NME4 gene.

Function 

The nucleoside diphosphate (NDP) kinases (EC 2.7.4.6) are ubiquitous enzymes that catalyze transfer of gamma-phosphates, via a phosphohistidine intermediate, between nucleoside and dioxynucleoside tri- and diphosphates. The enzymes are products of the nm23 gene family, which includes NME4. The first nm23 gene, nm23-H1 (NME1), was isolated based on its reduced expression in a highly metastatic murine melanoma cell line and was proposed to be a metastasis suppressing gene. The human equivalent was obtained by cDNA library screening using the murine gene as a probe and found to be homologous to the Drosophila awd gene. A second human gene, nm23-H2 (NME2), encoding a protein 88% identical to nm23-H1, was subsequently isolated. Both genes were localized on 17q21.3 and their gene products were formerly identified as the A and B subunits of NDP kinases. In mammals, functional NDP kinases are heterohexamers of the A and B monomers, which can combine at variable ratios to form different types of hybrids. These enzymes are highly expressed in tumors as compared with normal tissues. In some cell lines and in certain solid tumors, decreased expression of NME1 is associated with increased metastatic potential; moreover, when transfected into very aggressive cell lines, such as human breast carcinoma, NME1 decreased the metastatic potential. A third human gene, DR-nm23 (NME3), was identified and found to share high sequence similarity with the NME1 and NME2 genes. It is highly expressed in blast crisis transition of chronic myeloid leukemia. When overexpressed by transfection, NME3 suppressed granulocyte differentiation and induced apoptosis of myeloid precursor cells.

Model organisms 

Model organisms have been used in the study of NME4 function. A conditional knockout mouse line called Nme4tm1a(EUCOMM)Wtsi was generated at the Wellcome Trust Sanger Institute. Male and female animals underwent a standardized phenotypic screen to determine the effects of deletion. Additional screens performed:  - In-depth immunological phenotyping

References

Further reading